Vadiveloo is a surname. Notable people with the surname include:

David Vadiveloo, Australian film director and lawyer
G. Vadiveloo, Malaysian politician